Befandriana-Avaratra (literally North Befandriana; also Befandriana-Nord) is a city and urban commune (commune urbaine) in northern Madagascar. It belongs to the district of Befandriana-Nord, which is a part of Sofia Region. The population of the commune was estimated to be approximately 13,000 in 2001 commune census.

In addition to primary schooling the town offers secondary education at both junior and senior levels. The town provides access to hospital services to its citizens. Farming and raising livestock provides employment for 15% and 10% of the working population.  The most important crop is rice, while other important products are wheat, maize, cassava and barley. Industry and services provide employment for 5% and 70% of the population, respectively.

Transport
Route nationale 32
 Befandriana-Avaratra is served by a local airport.

See also 
 Befandriana Atsimo

References and notes 

Cities in Madagascar
Populated places in Sofia Region